Den za nas (in ) is the title of the fourth Macedonian language album by the Macedonian superstar Toše Proeski released in 2004. It is a 2-CD set which contains all of the songs performed on the National final in order to select a song for the Eurovision Song Contest 2004 with which Proeski would represent Macedonia in the contest. The winning song was "Life" which qualified for the final and finished on the 14th place in the final. Some extra songs such as "Dzvezdo Severnice", "Me Sakaš So Zborovi", "Ima Li Den Za Nas" and others were recorded especially for the album.

Track listing

(Titles are listed in Cyrillic script, in brackets are the Romanised script versions followed by a rough translation)

CD 1

Ѕвездо Севернице  (Dzvezdo Severnice - Northern Stars)
Ме Сакаш Со Зборови (Me Sakaš So Zborovi - You Love Me With Words)
Жена Балканска (Žena Balkanska - Female Balkan)
Има Ли Ден За Нас (Ima Li Den Za Nas - Is There a Day For Us)
Велам Лејди (Velam Lejdi - I Say Lady)
Никада (Nikada - Never) (in Serbian)  Title translates as "Nowhere" in Macedonian.
Чија Си (Čija si - Whose Are You) (in Serbian)  Title translates as "Who Do You" in Macedonian.
Life (in English)

CD 2

Зошто отиде (Zošto Otide - Why did you go)
Ангел Си Ти (Angel Si Ti - You Are An Angel)
Далеку Од Мене (Daleku Od Mene - Far From Me)
Еј Синоока, Еј Босонога (Ej Sinooka, Ej Bosonoga - Hey Blue-eyed, Hey Barefoot)
Го лажам Секој Нов Рефрен (Go Lažam Sekoj Nov Refren - I Lie Every New Chorus)
Љубена (Ljubena - Beloved)
Парче од Европа (Parče Od Evropa - Piece of Europe)
Сон Егзотичен (Son Egzotičen - Exotic Dream)

References 

Toše Proeski albums
2004 albums